The Belgian Women's Volleyball Cup is a Belgian women's Volleyball Cup competition held every single year and it is organized by the Royal Belgian Volleyball Federation (Koninklijk Belgisch Volleybal Verbond  KBVB), it was established in 1968.

Competition history

Winners list

Honours by club

References

External links
  Belgian Royal Volleyball Association 

Volleyball in Belgium